Santiago Ventura Bertomeu (born 5 January 1980) is a retired tennis player from Spain. He was born in Castellón, Spain and lives in Burriana, Spain. He is a clay court specialist and is known for the considerable use of drop shots during his matches.

Ventura reached a career-high singles ranking of world No. 65 on 3 March 2008. He reached a career-high doubles ranking of world No. 37 on 7 July 2008.

He was the first player to be beaten by Andy Murray on the ATP Tour, in the first round of the Aegon Championships tournament in 2005.

Career finals

Singles (1 title)

Doubles (5 titles, 3 runner-ups)

ATP Challenger and ITF Futures finals

Singles: 22 (13–9)

Doubles: 55 (38–17)

Notes

References

External links
 
 
 Ventura World ranking history

1980 births
Living people
Sportspeople from Castellón de la Plana
Spanish male tennis players
Tennis players from the Valencian Community